Research paper may refer to:
 Academic paper (also called scholarly paper), which is in academic journals and contains original research results or reviews existing results or shows a totally new invention
 Position paper, an essay that represents the author's opinion
 Term paper, written by high school or college students
 Thesis or dissertation, a document submitted in support of a candidature for a degree or professional qualification, presenting the author's research and findings

See also 
 Academic publishing, the sub-field of publishing which distributes academic research and scholarship
 Academic writing, which is any writing assignment given in an academic setting
 Research paper mill
 Scientific writing, which reports original, empirical and theoretical work within a scientific field
 White paper

References